Now That's What I Call Music! 3 is the third volume of the Now That's What I Call Music! series in the United States. It was released on December 7, 1999, debuting at number nine on the Billboard 200 albums chart. It has been certified 2× Platinum by the RIAA.

Reception 

"There isn't anything tying these singles together musically, except for the fact that they were hits," says Steve Huey of AllMusic, "but all in all, it makes for a pretty entertaining and diverse snapshot of pop music circa the turn of the millennium."

Track listing

Charts

Weekly charts

Year-end charts

Certifications

References 

1999 compilation albums
 002
Virgin Records compilation albums